Lisa Adams (born 18 November 1990) is a New Zealand Paralympic F37 shot putter and F38 discus thrower. Adams competed at the 2020 Summer Paralympics in Tokyo, Japan, and won a gold medal in Women's shot put F37, setting 4 Paralympics records in the process.

Early life and athletic career
Adams was born and grew up in Rotorua, New Zealand. She was diagnosed with left hemiplegia, a form of cerebral palsy, at an early age. She played netball and basketball when she was growing up, and played rugby with the Waikite women's able-bodied team in 2017.

In 2018 she became the first woman to play with the New Zealand men's national team at the Physical Disability Rugby League (PDRL) Commonwealth Championship. She was selected as flag bearer for the championship's opening ceremony.

Adams began competing in para-athletics in 2018 at the age of 28. She became world champion and world record holder in the F37 shot put in 2019, winning a gold medal at the 2019 World Para Athletics Championships.

Personal life
Adams is the younger sister of Valerie Adams, who is also her personal coach. Basketball player Steven Adams is her younger brother.

References

External links
 
 

1990 births
Living people
Sportspeople from Rotorua
New Zealand female shot putters
Track and field athletes with cerebral palsy
Paralympic athletes of New Zealand
Paralympic gold medalists in athletics (track and field)
Paralympic gold medalists for New Zealand
World record holders in Paralympic athletics
Athletes (track and field) at the 2020 Summer Paralympics
Medalists at the 2020 Summer Paralympics